Samgori is a station of the Tbilisi Metro on the Akhmeteli–Varketili Line (First Line). It serves the district and the neighbourhood it is named after. Next to the station is the Tbilisi junction station of the same name of Samgori (sometimes called Navtlughi). Samgori metro station has two main entrances, the one from Moscow ave and the one from Kakheti highway connected with a tunnel that until the 90s had a travelator. The station walls are decorated with relief images. The station was opened on 5 May 1971 as an extension of the 300 Aragveli–Didube line.

References

External links 
 Samgori station page at Tbilisi Municipal Portal

Tbilisi Metro stations
Railway stations opened in 1971
1971 establishments in Georgia (country)